XIX GmbH was a Swiss aircraft manufacturer based in Kronbühl, founded by Michi Kobler. The company specialized in the design and manufacture of paragliders in the form of ready-to-fly aircraft.

The company seems to have been founded before 1998 and gone out of business in about 2009.

The company was organized as a Gesellschaft mit beschränkter Haftung, a Swiss limited liability company.

In 2003, the company had a wide range of paragliders in their line, including the beginner Smile, the beginner to intermediate Art, the intermediate Form and Inter, the performance Top and the Sens competition wing series.

Aircraft 
Summary of aircraft built by XIX:
XIX Art
XIX Form
XIX Inter
XIX Sens
XIX Smile
XIX Top

References

External links
Company website archives on Archive.org

Defunct aircraft manufacturers of Switzerland
Paragliders
Swiss brands